The Shadow Dragons, released on October 27, 2009, is the fourth novel of The Chronicles of the Imaginarium Geographica, a book series begun by Here, There Be Dragons. It was preceded by The Indigo King and followed by The Dragon's Apprentice.

Synopsis
In 1942, protagonists John (J.R.R. Tolkien), Jack (C.S. Lewis), and Charles (Charles Williams) return to the Archipelago of Dreams as the last stones of the Keep of Time fall, endangering the Cartographer (Merlin)'s study and the inaccessible "future" door. As the second World War rages, the Imperial Cartological Society - led by writer/explorer Sir Richard Burton - rebuilds the Keep at the request of the animated shadow, called the 'Shadow King', of antagonist Mordred; whereupon the three protagonist Caretakers unite with past Caretakers (the Caretakers Emeritis) at Tamerlane House, built by Edgar Allan Poe in the Nameless Isles of the Archipelago. Rose Dyson, the Grail Child; Don Quixote; Archimedes the owl; and Stellan Sigurdsson retrieve and repair Caliburn. The Caretakers are betrayed by Rudyard Kipling and Daniel Defoe but supported when Burton, Doyle, and Houdini defect from the Imperial Cartological Society. Charles and the badger Fred pursue Defoe and burn down the Shadow King's Keep.

When Rose, Archimedes, and Quixote return, the Nameless Isles are under siege by children governed by the Shadow King since 1926, under the sub-antagonist Chancellor Murdoch, who, through the Lance of Longinus, can command the shadows of all Dragons except of the Dragon Samaranth. The children are driven back by the Tin Man (Roger Bacon), and the shadows of the Dragons are prevented from the Nameless Isles.

The Shadow King kills Artus, the King of the Archipelago and descendant of Arthur Pendragon; whereafter Kipling reveals himself as an agent of the Caretakers'; Rose Dyson incapacitates the Chancellor; and Stephen, Queen Aven's son, kills him with Caliburn. Finally, Rose frees each of the dragons, leaving Samaranth the last dragon alive. Stephen becomes the new King of the Archipelago, and the Dragonships, now soulless, are no longer allowed past the Frontier between worlds. John, Jack, and Charles are returned to Oxford and to their own time, and forge a full alliance, to be implemented in seven years, with Burton and the Imperial Cartological Society.

Characters

The Caretakers

Current
John/J.R.R. Tolkien is the series' protagonist and second-eldest Caretaker, aged near fifty. Since the first novel (set roughly 1916), 'Caretaker Principa' of the Imaginarium Geographica. Under the tutelage of a former Caretaker, Prof. Stellan Sigurdsson, until Stellan's murder.

Jack/C.S. Lewis is the youngest Caretaker, aged around forty-four; now teaching at Oxford, but the most easy-going of the trio. He is particularly affected by the Winter King's weapon, the Spear of Destiny. The reincarnation of Captain Nemo disconcerts Jack initially, until he teaches Nemo to become the eponymous hero.

Charles/Charles Williams is the eldest Caretaker, aged around fifty-six years old. In this novel, Charles himself is prominent, especially as it dealt with time and space travel, of which Charles is quite knowledgeable; but learns he is to die soon after the adventures of The Shadow Dragons, and quickly chooses to train the badger Fred (the grandson of the badger Tummeler, and son of Uncas) as his apprentice.

Past (Emeritis)
Tamerlane House (based on Edgar Allan Poe's poem Tamerlane), on a secret island in the Archipelago, houses the portraits of previous Caretakers, re-animated against the Winter King:
J.M. Barrie (called 'Jamie'), an ex-Caretaker still loyal to the cause
Tycho Brahe
Miguel de Cervantes
Geoffrey Chaucer, the first Caretaker
Leonardo da Vinci
Chrétien de Troyes
Daniel Defoe, a spy for the Winter King
Charles Dickens, Caretaker who recruited Magwich and Sir Richard Burton
Alexandre Dumas
Johann Wolfgang von Goethe
Jakob Grimm, a spy for the Winter King
Nathaniel Hawthorne, de facto head of security
Washington Irving
Johannes Kepler
Rudyard Kipling, a triple agent, working for the Caretakers
Thomas Malory
Edgar Allan Poe, the "master" of the Tamerlane House.
Franz Schubert, attuned to the supernatural
William Shakespeare
Mary Shelley, the only female Caretaker
Percy Shelley
Edmund Spenser
Jonathan Swift
Mark Twain, or Samuel Clemens
Jules Verne, the Prime Caretaker who makes his first physical appearance in the series at the end of the novel
Bert/H.G. Wells, the current Caretakers' guide since the first novel; father of Aven, grandfather of Stephen.

Other characters
The Winter King, in "shadow" form, wields the Spear of Destiny in hopes of taking control of both the mythical and the historical world.
Mordred/Madoc, as he appears at the bottom of the waterfall at the Edge of the World; Rose's father; he mends Caliburn when Rose promises to bring him a door enabling his freedom.
Don Quixote, a knight who assists the Caretakers.
Artus, the King of the Archipelago, descendant of King Arthur; he sacrifices himself in the battle; also known as Bug.
Aven, the Queen of the Archipelago; Bert's daughter; mother of Stephen and Captain Nemo's lover.
Stephen, the son of Nemo and Aven; it is hinted he has feelings for Laura Glue.
Rose Dyson, the daughter of Mordred, called the 'Grail Child' after her mother, the Holy Grail; raised in part by Hugo Dyson, and therefore named after him. She is the key to the existence of the Archipelago and crucial to the plot of the novel. Because she has died in some possible histories but not in others, only some characters in the novel can see her.
The Cartographer/Merlin/Myrddin, Mordred's twin brother, forced to become the Cartographer after their feud.
Captain Nemo, reincarnated as a young boy.
Laura Glue, the granddaughter of Peter Pan; former member of the "Lost Boys"; and now the leader of the Valkyries; it is hinted she has feelings for Stephen.
Lancelot, presented as the guard to the priestesses of Avalon- one of which is identified as Guinevere, whom he is punished never to see again.
Lady of the Lake, who presents Caliburn to Rose, Bert, and Quixote.
Richard Francis Burton, the head of the Imperial Cartological Society; a former Caretaker.
Harry Houdini, apprentice of Burton and member of the Imperial Cartological Society. During most of the novel, he obtains doors from the Keep of Time.
Arthur Conan Doyle, apprentice of Burton and member of the Imperial Cartological Society. He is partnered with Houdini for most of the novel, and he is mostly referred to as 'The Detective', while Houdini is 'The Magician'.
Archimedes, Rose's constant companion, a mechanical owl.
Uncas, a badger, son of Tummeler, allegedly the model of C.S. Lewis' character Trufflehunter; squire to Don Quixote.
Fred, Uncas' son; later Charles' apprentice as Caretaker.
Grimilkin/The Cheshire Cat, An elder god in the form of a cat, bound by a leather collar distinguished by runes and a bell.

References

2009 American novels
American fantasy novels
Novels based on Don Quixote
The Chronicles of the Imaginarium Geographica
Modern Arthurian fiction
Fiction set in 1942